Habib Dehghani (born July 18, 1983) is an Iranian footballer. He currently plays for Damash Gilan in the IPL.

Club career
Dehghani joined Saipa in 2007, after spending the previous season at Saba Battery. After Sanat Naft relegation to lower division he joined Pro League side Damash.

References

External links

1983 births
Living people
Saipa F.C. players
Iranian footballers
Saba players
Sanat Naft Abadan F.C. players
Damash Gilan players
Persian Gulf Pro League players
Association football goalkeepers